Liptena bolivari, the Bolivar's liptena, is a butterfly in the family Lycaenidae. It is found in southern Nigeria, Cameroon, Equatorial Guinea (Río Muni) and Gabon. The habitat consists of wetter forests.

References

Butterflies described in 1905
Liptena